Garden State Roller Derby is a flat track roller derby league based in Newark, New Jersey. Founded in 2006, it has three home teams, and two travel teams which compete against teams from other leagues. Garden State Roller Derby is a member of the Women's Flat Track Derby Association (WFTDA).

History
The NJ Dirty Dames was founded in March 2006 as the first roller derby league in New Jersey, and was based in Kendall Park. It merged with the Garden State Rollergirls June 1 2008, with its All Star team, the Hub City Hellrazors, initially becoming an additional intraleague team.

In 2009, the league was featured in an item on CBS News. The league was accepted into the Women's Flat Track Derby Association Apprentice Program in September 2009, and became full members of the WFTDA in June 2010.  By 2010, it had around 40 skaters.

In 2020, Garden State Rollergirls rebranded as Garden State Roller Derby.

WFTDA rankings

See also
Roller derby in the United States

References

Roller derby leagues established in 2006
Roller derby leagues in New Jersey
Sports in Newark, New Jersey
2006 establishments in New Jersey